The Bikini Carwash Company is a 1992 sex comedy film directed by Ed Hansen. It stars Joe Dusic, Kristi Ducati, and Ricki Brando. The sequel, The Bikini Carwash Company II, was released in 1993.

Writer George Buck Flower had guest starred in an episode of a modern Three Stooges style show, Nutz, Yutz and Klutz set in a car wash, shot in 1990 and was inspired to make a car wash a locale for a prettier cast of characters.

Plot
In the film, a group of young women decide to help out a local carwash by wearing bikinis while they wash customers' cars. This succeeds in attracting more customers, more money, and more attention from the police, who are not amused by the scantily-dressed employees.

Cast
 Joe Dusic as Jack 
 Kristi Ducati as Melissa
 Ricki Brando as Amy
 Sara Suzanne Brown as Sunny (credited as Suzanne Brown)
 Neriah Davis as Rita (credited as Neriah Napaul)
 Brook Lyn Page as Tammy Joe 
 Eric Ryan as Stanley
 Scott Strohmyer as Big Bruce
 Patrick M. Wright as Uncle Elmer (credited as Michael Wright)
 Kimberly Bee as Bobby Canova
 Jim Wynorski as Ralph
 Darrel Matson as Snuff (credited as Duane Matson)
 Matthew Cory Dunn as Donavan
 Jack Klarr as Judge Hawthorne
 Landon Hall as Miss Hawthorne

External links
 
 

1992 films
1990s sex comedy films
American sex comedy films
1990s English-language films
Films shot in California
American independent films
1992 comedy films
1990s American films
1992 independent films